Finlay Michael Brennan is an English professional footballer who played as a full back for Milton Keynes Dons.

Career
During the 2019–20 EFL Trophy, after progressing through the Milton Keynes Dons academy, Brennan made two appearances for MK Dons, against Fulham U21 and Wycombe Wanderers. During the 2019–20 season, Brennan was also loaned out to Kempston Rovers.

Career statistics

References

2001 births
Living people
Association football defenders
English footballers
Milton Keynes Dons F.C. players
Kempston Rovers F.C. players